Meta’ is a Grassfields language of Cameroon. The Moghamo variety is perhaps divergent enough to be considered a separate language. Ngamambo is 88% similar lexically to Meta’, and often is considered separate.

References

Momo languages
Languages of Cameroon